Láncara is a municipality in the Province of Lugo in Galicia in north-west Spain. Láncara was the hometown of Ángel Castro y Argiz, father of Cuban leaders Fidel and Raúl Castro.

Municipalities in the Province of Lugo